André Previn Plays Songs by Vernon Duke is a piano solo, jazz album by André Previn. It was recorded in August 1958. It was intended as a homage to jazz composer Vernon Duke. It was released in 1958 by Contemporary Records as C 3558. It was Previn's second album dedicated in its entirety to a single composer. After its release, other two tribute albums followed: André Previn Plays Songs by Jerome Kern (1959) and André Previn Plays Songs by Harold Arlen (1960).

Track listing
All pieces composed by Vernon Duke.
 "Cabin in the Sky" - 4:05
 "Autumn in New York" - 3:53
 " The Love I Long For" - 3:59
 "Ages Ago" - 3:50
 "Taking a Chance on Love" - 5:17
 "What Is There to Say" - 3:58
 "I Can't Get Started" - 5:26
 "I Like the Likes of You" - 3:46
 "Round About" - 4:38
 "April in Paris" - 3:43

Personnel
André Previn - piano
Phil De Lancie - digital remastering

References

1958 albums
André Previn albums
Contemporary Records albums
Solo piano jazz albums
Vernon Duke tribute albums